Steal Heart is a 2014 South Korean television series starring Kim Ok-vin and Lee Hee-joon. It aired on JTBC from May 19 to November 11, 2014, on Mondays and Tuesdays at 21:50 (KST) time slot for 50 episodes.

Synopsis
Kang Yoo-na (Kim Ok-bin) is the daughter of a pickpocket who learned the trade from her father and is already famous in her own right (with a prolific rap sheet of her very own, and three prior convictions). After being released from prison, she works as a part-time barista at a friend's café, but sometimes goes back to her old habits. Yoo-na shares a multiplex house with a rag-tag group of personalities, including an ex-gangster, a call girl, and a day laborer. They may not have much to boast about, but they are bright and warm people who live their daily lives to the fullest.

Things take an interesting turn when they get a new neighbor — unemployed but seemingly pure-hearted Kim Chang-man (Lee Hee-joon) moves in. Chang-man is an aspiring social worker, and as Yoo-na gets to know the salt-of-the-earth good boy next door, he starts to change them all for the better. Residing together under the same roof, they come to understand each other and mend their past wounds.

Cast

 Kim Ok-vin as Kang Yoo-na
 Lee Hee-joon as Kim Chang-man
 Lee Moon-sik as Han Man-bok 
 Shin So-yul as Han Da-young
 Kim Hee-jung as Madam Hong 
 Baek Chang-min as Han Dong-min 
 Jung Jong-joon as Old man Jang 
 Jo Hee-bong as Hong Gye-pal
 Seo Yoo-jung as Kim Mi-sun
 Kim Young-woong as Byun Chil-bok 
 Kim Eun-soo as Uhm Hye-sook 
 Ahn Nae-sang as Bong Dal-ho
 Kang Shin-hyo as Kim Nam-soo
 Oh Na-ra as Park Yang-soon
 Im Hyun-sik as Kang Bok-chun
 Kim Min-ki as Yoon Min-kyu
 Yoon Da-hoon as Jung Da-hoon
 Ha Eun-seol as Yoon-ji
 Yoo Gun as Tae-sik
 Kim Yoon-joo as Chan-mi
 Ra Mi-ran as Kkang-soon
 Ryu Hye-rin as Hwa-sook
 Song Sam-dong as Dae-gil
 Shin Hyun-tak as Im Dong-ho
 Song Chae-hwan as Hwang Jung-hyun
 Yoon Yong-hyun as Baendaeng-yi
 Lee Je-shin as Jjang-gu's mother
 Ki Jung-soo as president of second-hand shop
 Jung Yoo-min as Kim Young-mi
 Han Kap-soo as Kim Jong-ho
 Yoon Sang as Director Lee
 Joo Min-kyung as Jin-mi
 Shin Dong-mi as Hong Gye-sook
 Hong Seok-yeon as Doksa
 Choi Beom-ho as President Kwak
 Lee Bit-na as Hyun-jung
 Kim Joo-young as Jung Yong-geun
 Jung Ah-rang as Hee-young
 Moon Jung-soo as Mang-chi
 Park Woo-chun as Noh Ho-jin
 Choi Jung-hwa as staff of administration office
 Oh Eun-chan as Hyun-chul
 Hwang Tae-kwang
 Jung Ae-hwa

Ratings
In this table,  represent the lowest ratings and  represent the highest ratings.

Awards and nominations

International broadcast
 It aired in Vietnam from October 29, 2015, on VTV3 under the title Trái tim bị đánh cắp.

References

External links
  
 
 

2014 South Korean television series debuts
2014 South Korean television series endings
JTBC television dramas
South Korean romance television series
South Korean romantic comedy television series
Television series by Drama House